These are the Billboard magazine R&B albums that have reached number-one in 1983.

See also 
1983 in music
List of number-one R&B singles of 1983 (U.S.)
Hot 100 number-one hits of 1983 (United States)

1983